Triyatno (born 20 December 1987) is an Indonesian weightlifter. He competed at the 2008, 2012, and 2016 Summer Olympics and won a silver and a bronze medal.

Career 
At the 2006 Junior World Championships he won the bronze medal in the 62 kg category. He won the bronze medal again at the 2007 Junior World Championships in the same category.

He ranked 9th at the 2006 World Weightlifting Championships in the 62 kg category, and was 7th at the 2007 World Weightlifting Championships in the same category.

Triyatno competed in the 69 kg category at the 2008 Asian Weightlifting Championships, ranking 4th with a total of 300 kg. He won the bronze medal at the 2008 Summer Olympics in the 62 kg category, lifting a total of 298 kg. He won the bronze medal in the 69 kg category at the 2009 World Weightlifting Championships, with 330 kg in total.

At the 2012 Summer Olympics Triyatno won the silver medal with a total of 333 kg in the 69 kg category. He lifted only 317 kg at the 2016 Summer Olympics and placed ninth.

Awards and nominations

References 

1987 births
Living people
Indonesian male weightlifters
Weightlifters at the 2008 Summer Olympics
Weightlifters at the 2012 Summer Olympics
Weightlifters at the 2016 Summer Olympics
Olympic weightlifters of Indonesia
Olympic bronze medalists for Indonesia
Olympic silver medalists for Indonesia
World Weightlifting Championships medalists
Olympic medalists in weightlifting
Weightlifters at the 2006 Asian Games
Weightlifters at the 2010 Asian Games
Medalists at the 2012 Summer Olympics
Medalists at the 2008 Summer Olympics
Weightlifters at the 2014 Asian Games
Asian Games bronze medalists for Indonesia
Asian Games medalists in weightlifting
Medalists at the 2010 Asian Games
People from Metro (city)
Sportspeople from Lampung
Southeast Asian Games gold medalists for Indonesia
Southeast Asian Games medalists in weightlifting
Weightlifters at the 2018 Asian Games
Competitors at the 2007 Southeast Asian Games
Competitors at the 2009 Southeast Asian Games
Competitors at the 2011 Southeast Asian Games
20th-century Indonesian people
21st-century Indonesian people